Fairland is a census-designated place and an unincorporated area in Montgomery County, Maryland,  United States. It had a population of 25,396 per the 2020 census.

Geography
As an unincorporated area, Fairland's boundaries are not officially defined. Fairland is, however, recognized by the United States Census Bureau as a census-designated place, and by the United States Geological Survey as a populated place located at  (39.079458, -76.947701).  Fairland is one of the many neighborhoods of Silver Spring.

Demographics

2020 census

Note: the US Census treats Hispanic/Latino as an ethnic category. This table excludes Latinos from the racial categories and assigns them to a separate category. Hispanics/Latinos can be of any race.

2000 Census
At the 2000 census there were 21,738 people, 8,612 households, and 5,460 families living in the area. The racial makeup of the area was 35.75% White, 42.99% African American, 0.25% Native American, 14.51% Asian, 0.03% Pacific Islander, 2.93% from other races, and 3.55% from two or more races. Hispanic or Latino of any race were 6.72%.

Of the 8,612 households 34.8% had children under the age of 18 living with them, 42.4% were married couples living together, 17.0% had a female householder with no husband present, and 36.6% were non-families. 27.1% of households were one person and 2.2% were one person aged 65 or older. The average household size was 2.50 and the average family size was 3.11.

The age distribution was 25.4% under the age of 18, 9.1% from 18 to 24, 39.9% from 25 to 44, 19.9% from 45 to 64, and 5.6% 65 or older. The median age was 32 years. For every 100 females, there were 83.2 males. For every 100 females age 18 and over, there were 78.2 males.

The median household income was $56,624 and the median family income  was $62,189. Males had a median income of $46,123 versus $38,962 for females. The per capita income for the area was $28,603. About 4.6% of families and 5.3% of the population were below the poverty line, including 5.2% of those under age 18 and 10.6% of those age 65 or over.

References

 
Census-designated places in Maryland
Census-designated places in Montgomery County, Maryland